John Francis Erskine, Earl of Mar (17411825) was restored by act of Parliament to the title of Earl of Mar in June 1824, his 83rd year. The title had previously been forfeit, following the attainting of his predecessor, John Erskine in 1716 for having Jacobite sympathies. He died in August 1825.

John Francis Erskine is reckoned to be both the 24th earl in the first creation of the title, and seventh earl (in the seventh creation), due to the confusion following a nineteenth-century dispute over the succession after his grandson's death.

References

 Burke's Peerage and Baronetage, 105th ed. (1978) ISBN (none), p1753, p1756

1741 births
1825 deaths
18th-century Scottish people
19th-century Scottish people
Erskine, John
John Francis
Dukes of Mar
Lords Erskine